École biblique et archéologique française de Jérusalem, commonly known as École Biblique, is a French academic establishment in Jerusalem specializing in archaeology and Biblical exegesis.

History

Foundation 
The school was founded in 1890 under the name École pratique d’études bibliques by Marie-Joseph Lagrange, a Dominican priest. Its studies were officially sanctioned by Pope Leo XIII in his papal encyclical Providentissimus Deus in 1893.

Modernist crisis 
The election of Pope Pius X in 1903 saw the beginning of a conservative reaction against perceived "Modernists" inside the Catholic Church. Père Lagrange, like other scholars involved in the 19th-century renaissance of biblical studies, was suspected of being a Modernist. The historical-critical method was considered suspect by the Vatican. His 1904 book, The Historical Method, drew criticism. In 1905, the Pontifical Biblical Commission issued a caution about two of his methodological principles.

The situation worsened with the enactment of the papal decree Lamentabili sane exitu and the papal encyclical Pascendi Dominici gregis by Pius X in 1907, both of which condemned Modernism as heretical. In 1909, conflict between the Dominicans and the Jesuits, common at the time, resulted in the Pope's creation of the Pontifical Biblical Institute, as a Jesuit rival to the school. In 1912 Lagrange was given an order of silence for the Revue Biblique to cease publication and to return to France. The École itself was closed for a year, but was then re-opened by the new Pope Benedict XV and Lagrange was allowed to return to Jerusalem continue its work.

Subsequent years 
In 1920 the school took its current name, following its recognition, by the Académie des Inscriptions et Belles-Lettres, as a national archaeological school in France. The enactment of the papal encyclical Divino afflante Spiritu by Pope Pius XII in 1943 officially sanctioned the use of historical criticism in the study of the Bible, ending previous tensions between the school and the Vatican.

Following the discovery of the Dead Sea Scrolls, the scholars at the school have been heavily involved in the translation and interpretation of the texts. In 1956 the School published La Bible de Jérusalem, a work which strove both for critical translational rigour and for quality as a piece of literature; a second, revised version, was published in 1998.

Activities 
The school is part of the Dominican St. Stephen's Priory, French: "Couvent de Saint-Étienne". Most of the teachers of the École Biblique are Dominican friars, and all members of the Dominican priory are involved in the work of the École.

The priory is centred around the modern Basilica of St Stephen (Saint-Étienne) built over the ruins of an ancient predecessor, to which the supposed relics of Saint Stephen were transferred in 439, making the Byzantine-period church the centre of the cult of this particular saint.

Since its creation, the school has been involved in the exegesis of biblical text, and has carried out archaeological research, in a complementary manner and without secrecy, in Palestine and the adjacent territories. Its principal disciplines are epigraphy, the Semitic languages, Assyriology, Egyptology, other aspects of ancient history, geography, and ethnography.

It has the power to confer official doctorates in Holy Scripture. It publishes the Revue Biblique, which is a diverse collection of scholarship from its fields of excellence, and it also publishes material addressed to larger audiences, including a particular French translation of the Bible, known as the Jerusalem Bible (a work which strove both for critical translational rigour and for quality as a piece of literature).

Notable members
Among its most illustrious members, in addition to Marie-Joseph Lagrange, are Marie-Emile Boismard, Roland de Vaux, Raymond-Jacques Tournay, Jerome Murphy-O'Connor, and Pierre Benoit.

 Félix-Marie Abel (1878–1953)
 :pl:Charles Coüasnon, led the 1961–1977 excavations at the Church of the Holy Sepulchre
 Jean-Baptiste Humbert (born 1940)
 Louis-Hugues Vincent (1872–1960)

References

External links
 

 
Archaeological research institutes
Biblical archaeology
Biblical studies organizations
Educational institutions established in 1890
1890 establishments in the Ottoman Empire